is the ferry route between Miyajimaguchi, Hatsukaichi, Hiroshima and Miyajima (Itsukushima).

There are three ferries called the Miyajima-maru, the Nanaura-maru, and the Misen-maru.  One trip between Miyajima-guchi and Miyajima takes ten minutes.

History
The private boat route was founded in 1897.  The ferry route was placed in a public company in 1899.  The ferry route was bought by Sanyo Railway in 1903.  Sanyo Railway was nationalized as part of the Japanese Government Railways in 1906.
Japanese National Railways, which was reorganized from government railways in 1949, was privatized in 1987. Operations in the Hiroshima area were assigned to JR West.  JR West transferred the ferry business to its new subsidiary JR West Miyajima Ferry Co., Ltd. on April 1, 2009.  The route, commonly called Miyajima Renrakusen (宮島連絡船), was one of those classified as tetsudō renrakusen (鉄道連絡船), ferry routes as a part of railway network. All other JR renrakusen routes were closed by 1990 and the JR Miyajima Ferry was the last one of that kind until its separation in 2009.

Piers
Miyajima-guchi
Miyajima

See also
Miyajima Matsudai Kisen - operates a similar route

References

External links
JR Miyajima Ferry 

Transport in Hiroshima Prefecture
Ferry companies of Japan
Ferries of Japan
Miyajima Ferry